Mongkung (also spelt Möngküng), also known as Maingkaing, was a Shan state in what is today Burma. It belonged to the Eastern Division of the Southern Shan States. Its capital was Mong Kung, in the valley of the Nam Teng. The largest minority were Palaung people.

History
Mongkung state was founded in ancient times as Langkavadi. 
In 1835, after the British annexed Upper Burma and established their rule in the region, Mongkung had been formerly a feudatory state of Hsenwi.

Rulers
The rulers of Mongkung bore the title Myoza in 1835-54 and 1863–73; Saopha in 1854-63 and from 1873.

Saophas and Myozas
1835 - 1860                Hkun Long                          (d. 1860)
1860 - 1863                Hkun Long II
1863 - 1873                Gu Na                              (d. 1873)
1873 - 1879                Hkun San Kwan  
1879 - ....                Hkun Mong                          (b. 1873 - d. ....)
1879 - 1883                Heng Hkon Sang -Regent

References

External links
"Gazetteer of Upper Burma and the Shan states"
The Imperial Gazetteer of India

Shan States